Return to Paradise is an album by Randy Stonehill, released in 1989, on Myrrh Records. The title is a reference to Stonehill's earlier album, Welcome to Paradise.

This album was listed at No. 76 in the 2001 book, CCM Presents: The 100 Greatest Albums in Christian Music.

Track listing 
All songs written by Randy Stonehill except as otherwise noted.

Side one 
 "Starlings"  – 5:00
 "Stand Like Steel"  – 4:55
 "I Don't Ever Want to Live Without You" (Pierce Pettis) – 4:10
 "This Friend of Old" (David Edwards) – 4:00
 "You Can Still Walk Tall"  – 5:00
 "True Blood"  – 5:02

Side two 
 "Strong Hand of Love" (Mark Heard) – 2:54
 "Christmas at Denny's"  – 5:53
 "Love Tells No Lies"  – 4:20
 "Weight of the Sky"  – 3:28
 "Ready To Go"  – 4:44

Personnel 
 Randy Stonehill – acoustic guitars, lead vocals, backing vocals (3)
 Mark Heard – accordion, electric guitars, mandolin, bass (2, 9), tambourine (7)
 Phil Keaggy – classical guitar (3), 12-string guitar (9)
 Greg Leisz – pedal steel guitar, lap steel guitar
 Bill Batstone – fretless bass
 David Miner – acoustic bass
 Tom Willett – bass (7)
 Doug Matthews – drums
 David Baker – percussion
 Joe Weed – fiddle, viola
 Pam Dwinell – backing vocals

Production 
 Tom Willett – executive producer
 Mark Heard – producer, recording, mixing 
 Randy Stonehill – co-producer 
 Derri Daugherty – second engineer
 Gary Gerhart – second engineer
 Dave Hackbarth – second engineer
 Stephen Padgett – second engineer
 Dan Reed – second engineer
 Tom Baker – mastering at Future Disc Systems (Hollywood, California)
 Laurie Fink – cover coordinator 
 Karl Shields – art direction, design 
 Linda Krikorian – photography
 Roseanne McIIvane – hair stylist, make-up 
 Ray Ware – management

References 

1989 albums
Randy Stonehill albums